"Stop the World (and Let Me Off)" is a song written and originally performed by Carl Belew. It was released as a single first by Belew in January 1958. It was later followed by competing versions by Patsy Cline and Johnnie & Jack. The latter duo's version became the first successful version of the song to be a hit. It was later covered a decade later by Waylon Jennings and then again by Susan Raye in 1974.

Carl Belew version
Carl Belew wrote and recorded the original version of "Stop the World (and Let Me Off)". The song's composition was also credited to W.S. Stevenson (a pen name for Four Star Record executive Bill McCall). The session was recorded in 1957. In December 1957, Belew's song was released as a single via Four Star Records, with the B-side being "I Can't Forget."

Track listing
7" vinyl single

 "Stop the World (and Let Me Off)" – 2:12
 "I Can't Forget" – 2:40

Patsy Cline version

American country singer Patsy Cline notably covered "Stop the World (and Let Me Off)". Cline's version was originally recorded on December 13, 1957 in Nashville, Tennessee in sessions produced by Owen Bradley. The song was given to Cline by Four Star executive Bill McCall, who hoped it would become her follow-up hit to 1957's "Walkin' After Midnight." Several other tracks were cut the same day, including "Walking Dream" and "If I Could See the World (Through the Eyes of a Child)". McCall urged Bradley to incorporate a "pop sound" into the session, according to biographer Ellis Nassour.

Cline's version of the song was released on January 13, 1957 via Decca Records. On the B-side was the song "Walking Dream." Despite multiple promotional appearances, Cline's version failed to become a hit. In a review of a 1993 compilation of Cline's Stephen Thomas Erlewine of Allmusic praised the track as being "very good" and "verging on the excellent."

Track listing
7" vinyl single

 "Stop the World (and Let Me Off)" – 2:26
 "Walking Dream" – 2:16

Johnnie & Jack version

"Stop the World (and Let Me Off)" was notably covered in 1958 by American country music duo, Johnnie & Jack. Their version was recorded in January 1958 at the RCA Victor Studio, located in Nashville, Tennessee. The session was produced by Chet Atkins. In January 1958, it was released on the RCA Victor label. In February 1958, it peaked at number seven on Billboards country and western best seller chart. It spent 18 weeks on the charts and was also ranked No. 24 on Billboards 1958 year-end country and western chart. It was the duo's final single to peak in the country top ten.

Track listing
7" vinyl single

 "Stop the World (and Let Me Off)" – 2:32
 "Camel Walk Stroll" – 2:05

Charts

Waylon Jennings version

In 1965, American country singer-songwriter Waylon Jennings notably covered "Stop the World (and Let Me Off)" and released it as a single. Jennings recorded the track at the RCA Victor Studio in Nashville on March 18, 1965. Several additional tracks were cut during the same session. It was released as a single in August 1965 on the RCA Victor label backed with "The Dark Side of Fame." Jennings' version peaked at number 16 on the Billboard Hot Country Singles chart in 1965, becoming his first top 40 single and second charting hit. 

The song was released on Jennings' debut studio record titled Folk-Country. Thom Jurek of AllMusic commented on the track in his review of the album: "'Stop the World (and Let Me Off)' is indicative of the kind of countrypolitan fare Atkins was developing at the label. And while this is only 1963 [1965], the listener can hear Jennings stretching the song to its limits -- at least the limits imposed by a mainstream country single.

Track listing
7" vinyl single

 "Stop the World (and Let Me Off)" – 2:00
 "The Dark Side of Fame" – 2:30

Charts

Susan Raye version

In 1974, American country singer Susan Raye covered the song and released it as a single the same year. Raye's version of the song was recorded at Buck Owens Studios, located in Bakersfield, California. The session was held on February 6, 1974 and was produced by Buck Owens himself, alongside Jim Shaw. It was the only track recorded during the session. Raye's version of "Stop the World (and Let Me Off)" was issued as a single via Capitol Records in March 1974. Raye's version peaked at number 18 on the Billboard Hot Country Singles chart in 1974 and was among her final singles to become a top 20 hit. The song was later issued on Raye's 1974 album, Singing Susan Raye.

Track listing
7" vinyl single

 "Stop the World (and Let Me Off)" – 2:17
 "Love's Ups and Downs" – 2:22

Charts

References

Footnotes

Books

External links
 Original versions of "Stop the World (and Let Me Off)" at Second Hand Songs

1957 singles
1958 singles
1965 singles
1974 singles
Carl Belew songs
Patsy Cline songs
Waylon Jennings songs
Johnnie & Jack songs
Susan Raye songs
Capitol Records singles
Decca Records singles
RCA Victor singles
Song recordings produced by Chet Atkins
Song recordings produced by Owen Bradley
1957 songs
Songs written by Carl Belew
Songs written by W.S. Stevenson